David Francis Dravecky (born February 14, 1956) is an American former professional baseball player, a motivational speaker, and an author. He played Major League Baseball (MLB) for the San Diego Padres (1982–87) and San Francisco Giants (1987–89). He was named an All-Star with the Padres in 1983. Cancer ended his career as the Giants were reaching the 1989 World Series. He won the Hutch Award in 1989.

Career

Early career 
A left-handed pitcher, Dravecky represented the Padres in 1983, his second season, at the All-Star game, winning 14 games that year. Equally proficient as a starter and coming out of the bullpen, Dravecky helped the San Diego win their first pennant the following season in 1984.

Dravecky became friends with two other Padres pitchers, Mark Thurmond and Eric Show, who also held strong Christian beliefs. In the spring of 1984, Show recruited the other two to the John Birch Society, a far right US political organization, and the three were the subjects of wide reporting after they distributed Birch literature from a booth at the June 1984 Del Mar Fair. Dravecky stated he saw Birch beliefs as the "natural outgrowth" of a born-again Christian philosophy. Over his first six seasons, Dravecky had a 60–55 win–loss record, and the Associated Press wrote that he was better known for his association with the John Birch Society than his pitching.

On July 4, 1987, the San Francisco Giants acquired Dravecky, pitcher Craig Lefferts, and third baseman Kevin Mitchell from the San Diego Padres for pitchers Mark Grant and Mark Davis and third baseman Chris Brown for their pennant drive. He went 7–5 during the stretch, and in the playoffs pitched a shutout in Game 2 against the St. Louis Cardinals and lost Game 6 by a score of 1–0. The Cards won in seven games.

While with the Giants, Dravecky and teammates Scott Garrelts, Atlee Hammaker, and Jeff Brantley became known as the "God Squad" because of their strong Christian faith. Foregoing the hard-partying lifestyle of many of their teammates, they preferred to hold Bible studies in their hotel rooms while on the road.

Crisis and comeback 

The following season, a cancerous desmoid tumor was found in Dravecky's pitching arm. On October 7, 1988, he underwent surgery, which removed half of the deltoid muscle in his pitching arm and froze the humerus bone in an effort to eliminate all of the cancerous cells. Doctors advised Dravecky to wait until 1990 to pitch again, but Dravecky was determined to pitch in 1989. By July 1989, he was pitching in the minors, and on August 10, he made a highly publicized return to the major leagues, pitching eight innings and defeating Cincinnati 4–3. In his following start, five days later in Montreal, Dravecky pitched three no-hit innings, but in the fifth inning, he felt a tingling sensation in his arm. In the sixth inning, he started off shaky, allowing a home run to the leadoff batter and then hitting the second batter, Andrés Galarraga. Then, on his first pitch to Tim Raines, his humerus bone snapped; the sound of it breaking could be heard throughout the stadium. Dravecky collapsed on the mound. He had suffered a clean break midway between his shoulder and elbow, ending his season.

The Giants won the National League pennant in 1989 (defeating the Chicago Cubs in the NLCS in five games), and in the post-game celebration, Dravecky's arm was broken a second time when he was running out to the mound to celebrate. A doctor examining Dravecky's X-rays noticed a mass in his arm, which turned out to be malignant. Dravecky's cancer had returned, ending his career. Eighteen days later, Dravecky retired from baseball with a 64–57 record with 558 strikeouts and a 3.13 earned run average in  innings. He won the 1989 Willie Mac Award honoring his spirit and leadership.

Retirement and later career 
After two more surgeries, his left arm continued to deteriorate, and on June 18, 1991, less than two years after his comeback with the Giants, Dravecky's left arm and shoulder were amputated. After recovering from the surgery, Dravecky went on to begin a new career as a motivational speaker.

Dravecky wrote two books about his battles with cancer and his comeback attempt: Comeback, published in 1990 and written with Tim Stafford, and When You Can't Come Back, coauthored with wife Jan and Ken Gire and  published in 1992. He has also written a Christian motivational book, Called Up, published in 2004 by Zondervan. With the help of Stafford, Dravecky saw Comeback republished as a self-titled autobiography for children in 1992.

In pop culture 
In 2021, indie-folk artist Cousin Wolf released a song entitled "Dave Dravecky" as part of an album called "Nine Innings."

References

External links
Official website

Outreach of Hope

1956 births
Living people
Major League Baseball pitchers
San Diego Padres players
San Francisco Giants players
National League All-Stars
Baseball players from Youngstown, Ohio
American motivational speakers
American Christian writers
John Birch Society members
American amputees
Amarillo Gold Sox players
Hawaii Islanders players
Buffalo Bisons (minor league) players
Charleston Pirates players
Phoenix Firebirds players
San Jose Giants players
Youngstown State Penguins baseball players